Several ships of the Swedish Navy have been named HSwMS Wachtmeister, named after the Swedish noble family of Wachtmeister:

  was a ship launched in 1681 and lost in battle in 1719
  was a  launched in 1917 and decommissioned in 1947

Swedish Navy ship names